Compagnie Générale Immobiliere, or CGI is a Moroccan real-estate development compagnie which is listed on the Casablanca Stock Exchange since 2007

CGI was originally set up as part of CDG Development - which in itself is part of the CDG: Caisse de dépôt et de gestion.

CGI is active in several important real-estate sectors in the country: housing, tourism, business and shopping-centers and (semi) public projects such as universities.

Some main projects
Some of the recent, high-profile, developments of CGI include:

Tourism
In the tourist sector the groupe is involved in the following projects
 Nador: Rif Hotel and the Abdouna Trifa resort
 Marrakesh - resort
 Casablanca - 2 marina hotels and the development of the Casablanca Marina
 Fnideq - Karabo hotel
 Al Hoceima - Hôtel Mohamed V - QUEMADO RESORT

Commercial
 Rabat - multifunctional development l'Agdal and Ryad Center
 Casablanca - Centre commercial

Public sector
 Sale: Mohammed VI Football Academy
 Rabat: Sports Centre
 Oujda - new hospital campus
 Universities: 5 universities: Casablanca (2x), Oujda, Taroudant, Ouarzazate

Sources and references

External links
 Official website

Real estate companies of Morocco
Caisse de dépôt et de gestion